Tyszki-Gostery  is a village in the administrative district of Gmina Czerwin, within Ostrołęka County, Masovian Voivodeship, in east-central Poland.

The village has an approximate population of 60.

References

Tyszki-Gostery